Novy mir is a rural locality (a settlement) in Alexandrovskoye Rural Settlement, Talovsky District, Voronezh Oblast, Russia. The population was 65 as of 2010.

Geography
Novy mir is located 14 km north of Talovaya (the district's administrative centre) by road. Sergiyevsky is the nearest rural locality.

References 

Rural localities in Talovsky District